Behnam Ehsanpour (born 16 February 1992 in Behshahr) is an Iranian wrestler.
He won Bronze medal at the 2019 World Championships and silver at 2013 Summer Universiade.

References

External links
Profile on UWW Database

Sportspeople from Mazandaran province
1992 births
Living people
Iranian male sport wrestlers
Universiade medalists in wrestling
People from Behshahr
Universiade silver medalists for Iran
World Wrestling Championships medalists
Medalists at the 2013 Summer Universiade
Asian Wrestling Championships medalists
21st-century Iranian people